Ed Brophy was a longtime Pittsburgh Police leader, who served as Pittsburgh Police Chief from November 1923 until the Spring of 1926.

See also

 Police chief
 Allegheny County Sheriff
 List of law enforcement agencies in Pennsylvania

References

Chiefs of the Pittsburgh Bureau of Police